Gandaritis is a genus of moths in the family Geometridae described by Frederic Moore in 1868.

Species
 Gandaritis agnes (Butler, 1878)
 Gandaritis atricolorata (Grote & Robinson, 1866)
 Gandaritis evanescens (Butler, 1881)
 Gandaritis fixseni (Bremer, 1864)
 Gandaritis flavata Moore, [1868]
 Gandaritis flavescens (Xue, 1992)
 Gandaritis flavomacularis (Leech, 1897)
 Gandaritis impleta (Xue, 1990)
 Gandaritis maculata (C. Swinhoe, 1894)
 Gandaritis octoscripta (Wileman, 1912)
 Gandaritis placida (Butler, 1878)
 Gandaritis postalba (Wileman, 1920)
 Gandaritis powellata (Ferguson & Choi)
 Gandaritis pseudolargetaui (Wehrli, 1933)
 Gandaritis pyraliata (Denis & Schiffermüller, 1775)
 Gandaritis sinicaria (Leech, 1897)
 Gandaritis subalba (Prout, 1941)
 Gandaritis tricedista (Prout, 1938)
 Gandaritis tristis (Sterneck, 1928)
 Gandaritis whitelyi (Butler, 1878)

References

Cidariini